Andrew Bing (1574–1652) was an English scholar. He was a fellow of Peterhouse, Cambridge, and succeeded Geoffrey King as Regius Professor of Hebrew at Cambridge. He served on the "First Cambridge Company" charged by James I of England with translating parts of the Old Testament for the King James Version of the Bible.

Bing served as subdean of York Minster in 1606 and Archdeacon of Norwich in 1618.

References

Notes

 McClure, Alexander (1858) The Translators Revived: a biographical memoir of the authors of the English Version of the Holy Bible. Mobile, Alabama: R. E. Publications (republished by the Maranatha Bible Society, 1984 ASIN B0006YJPI8)
 Nicolson, Adam (2003) God's Secretaries: the making of the King James Bible. New York: HarperCollins 

Regius Professors of Hebrew (Cambridge)
1574 births
1652 deaths
Translators of the King James Version
17th-century English translators
16th-century English people
17th-century English clergy
Fellows of Peterhouse, Cambridge
Archdeacons of Norwich